West Wind Records was a jazz record label that released albums by many notable musicians during the 1980s. Some of these albums were previously issued on labels such as Circle Records.

Discography
 001 Anthony Braxton – The Coventry Concert  1980
 002 Archie Shepp plays Sydney Bechet: Passport to Paradise Impro 06 1981
 003 Manfred Zepf & Andrew Cyrille – Paintings
 004 Anthony Braxton If Memory Serves Me Right 1987
 005 Sunny Murray – Indelicacy 1987
 006 Archie Shepp Bird Fire: A Tribute to Charlie Parker Impro 05 1979
 007 Harry Beckett – Bremen Concert 1987
 008 String Trio of New York & Jay Clayton 1987
 011 Steve Lacy Live in Budapest 1988
 012 Georg Graewe Six Studies For Piano Solo
 014 John Lindberg Revolving Ensemble Relative Reliability 1988
 016 Eric Dolphy Unrealized Tapes 1964
 017 Dresch 4tet from Hungary Live in Cologne 1988
 019 Gary Bartz, Lee Konitz, Jackie McLean, Charlie Mariano with Joachim Kühn, Palle Danielsson, Han Bennink – Altissimo 1973
 021 Ray Anderson, Harry Beckett, Annie Whitehead a.o. U3 Klang 1988
 026 Perry Robinson – Nightmare Island 1988
 029 Dollar Brand (Abdullah Ibrahim) ...memories West54 WLW 8011 1973
 032 Clifford Brown and the Neal Hefti Orchestra EmArcy MG 36005 1955
 065 Art Blakey – For Minors Only Bethlehem BCP 6023 1957
 2001 Anthony Braxton The Coventry Concert 1980
 2002 Archie Shepp Passport to Paradise Impro 06 1981
 2004 Anthony Braxton If Memory Serves Me Right 1987
 2005 Sunny Murray Quartet Indelicacy 1987
 2006 Archie Shepp Bird Fire: A Tribute to Charlie Parker Impro 05 1979
 2008 String Trio of New York & Jay Clayton 1987
 2011 Steve Lacy Live in Budapest 1988
 2013 Sonny Clark Blues Mambo Time T 70010 1960
 2014 John Lindberg Revolving Ensemble Relative Reliability 1988
 2015 Kenny Dorham Hot Stuff from Brazil Fred Miles FM 403 1961
 2016 Eric Dolphy Unrealized Tapes 1964
 2018 Coleman Hawkins Body and Soul 1961
 2019 Gary Bartz, Lee Konitz, Jackie McLean, Charlie Mariano with Joachim Kühn, Palle Danielsson, Han Bennink Altissimo Philips (Jap) RJ–5102 1973
 2020 Dollar Brand Ode to Duke Ellington Inner City IC 6049 1973
 2022 Bill Evans His Last Concert in Germany 1980
 2023 V/A Trumpet Anthology
 2024 Carlo Mombelli Abstractions 1988
 2025 Chris Connor at the American Jazz Festival in Latin America 1961
 2026 Perry Robinson Nightmare Island 1988
 2027 Chet Baker My Funny Valentine
 2028 Bill Evans In His Own Way 1977
 2029 Abdullah Ibrahim Memories West54 WLW 8011 1973
 2030 Harry Beckett & Courtney Pine Live Vol. 2 1987
 2031 Bud Shank – Misty Eyes 1961
 2032 Clifford Brown and the Neal Hefti Orchestra EmArcy MG 36005 1955
 2033 Chet Baker Stella By Starlight
 2034 Coleman Hawkins The Tenor Genius 1958, 1964, 1967
 2036 Archie Shepp & Jeanne Lee Sophisticated Lady Circle RK 61084/29 1984
 2037 Chet Baker Tune Up: Chet Baker in Paris
 2038 Chet Baker Night Bird Circle RK 25680/22 1980
 2039 David Murray and the Low Class Conspiracy Flowers for Albert Circle RK 18877/8 + 1 track of RK 18877/4 1977
 2040 Dexter Gordon Midnight Dream Who's Who WWLP 21011 + 4 tracks of WWLP 21006 1977
 2041 McCoy Tyner – What's New? 1980
 2042 Gil Evans – Little Wing Circle RK 101978/13 + 1 track 1978
 2043 Paul Horn 500 Miles High 1980
 2044 Thad Jones & Mel Lewis The Orchestra 1978
 2045 Art Blakey Blakey's Theme Who's Who WWLP 21024 + 21026 1980
 2046 Stan Getz Autumn Leaves 1980
 2048 Thad Jones & Mel Lewis – Body and Soul (1978)
 2049 Kenny Dorham Shadow of Your Smile 1966
 2050 Yosuke Yamashita Trio – Ghosts by Albert Ayler 1977
 2051 Art Ensemble Of Chicago – Live in Berlin (1979)
 2052 Perry Robinson Call to the Stars 1990
 2053 Pepper Adams My One and Only Love Mode LP 112 1957
 2054 Milt Jackson & Ray Brown Fuji Mama 1976
 2055 Bill Evans How Deep is the Ocean 1965
 2056 Gil Evans Tokyo Concert 1976
 2057 Eric Dolphy Douglas SD 785 1963
 2058 Bill Evans The Brilliant Bill Evans 1979, 1980
 2059 Chet Baker in Paris Vol 2 Sonopresse 2S068–16685 + 2 alternate takes 1978
 2060 Mingus Dynasty At Bottom Live [sic] 1979
 2061 Bill Evans Live in Buenos Aires 1979 1979
 2062 Kenny Dorham – Jazz Festival in Latin America 1961
 2063 Eric Dolphy Naima 1964
 2064 Art Pepper Art in L.A. Trio PA 3141 1957
 2065 Art BlakeyFor Minors Only Bethlehem BCP 6023 1957
 2067 Dave Liebman First Visit Philips (Jap) RJ–5101 1973
 2068 Johnny Griffin in Tokyo 1976
 2069 Manny Albam The Jazz Greats (Jazz Greats of Our Time) Coral CRL 57173 1957
 2070 Manfred Bründl Bründl's Basslab Feat. Barry Altschul 1990
 2071 Art Pepper & Zoot Sims Art 'n Zoot 1981
 2072 Heinz Becker, Louis Sclavis & John Lindberg Transition FMP 1170 1987
 2073 Bill Evans With Monica Zetterlund 1975
 2074 Sonny Simmons Backwoods Suite 1982
 2075 Bill Evans My Foolish Heart 1973
 2076 Stan Getz Utopia 1978
 2077 Duke Ellington I'm Beginning to See the Light 1940–1966
 2078 Johnny Griffin Unpretentious Delights 1978
 2079 Dexter Gordon A Gordon Cantata 1978
 2080 Harry Beckett Les Jardins Du Casino 1987, 1991
 2081 Lee Konitz & Frank Wunsch Frank–Lee Speaking 1988–1989
 2082 Archie Shepp Perfect Passions 1978
 2083 Chet Baker Welcome Back 1987
 2084 V/A Concert in Argentina part of Halcyon HAL 113 1974
 2085 Paul Bley & Hans Lüdemann Moving Hearts 1991
 2086 Jürgen Seefelder The Standard Project 1992
 2088 Nat Adderley – Live on Planet Earth 1962, 1966, 1983
 2092 Monica Zetterlund/Bill Evans Waltz for Debbie 1997
 2097 Kenny Wheeler/Upper Austrian Jazz Orchestra 1995
 2108 Chet Baker Plays & Sings
 2116 Chick Corea Converge 1969
 2120 Old Folks 1999
 2124 Archie Shepp & Horace Parlan Mama Rose 1987
 2129 Ronnie Burrage – Just Natural 2000
 2155 Pat Metheny – The Move to the Groove 1983
 2200 Gilberto Gil – Em Concerto
 2201 Dino Saluzzi – Argentina 1984
 2202 Vera Guimaraes – Stirring the Forest
 2203 Tito Puente More Mambos On Broadway
 2206 Jürgen Seefelder & Azymuth Volta á Turma 1991
 2208 Soma Southern Cross 1990
 2211 Gilberto Gil Oriente: Live in Tokyo
 2212 Ástor Piazzolla – Unforgettable 1981
 2213 Ástor Piazzolla – Onda Nueve
 2214 Azymuth – Curumim 
 2215 Ruben Blades – Mucho Mejor
 2216 Tito Puente 20 Mambos/Take Five
 2220 Ástor Piazzolla Pulsacion
 2221 Tania Maria Alive & Cooking 1993
 2223 Irakere – From Havana With Love  1978
 2224 Gilberto Gil Esoterico: Live in the USA 1994 1994
 2240 Ana Vera – Exitos de Fado 
 2400 Woody Herman La Fiesta 1978
 2402 Thad Jones & Mel Lewis – A Touch Of Class (1978)
 2403 Cab Calloway & His Orchestra Get With Cab 1944–50
 2404 Lionel Hampton The Big Band 1983
 2405 Diahann Carroll A Tribute io Ethel Waters Orinda ORC 400 1978
 2406 Duke Ellington April in Paris 1969
 2407 Thad Jones & Mel Lewis Body And Soul 1978
 2410 Wolfgang Schmidtke Blues Variations

References

External links
Listing at Discogs

Jazz record labels